Tupkanlu (also Romanized as Tūpkānlū) is a village in Takmaran Rural District, Sarhad District, Shirvan County, North Khorasan Province, Iran. At the 2006 census, its population was 599, in 130 families.

References 

Populated places in Shirvan County